Donna Hennyey (born April 10, 1942) is a Canadian fencer. She competed at the 1972 and 1976 Summer Olympics.

She currently is an instructor at the University of Toronto Faculty of Dentistry, teaching nutrition.

References

1942 births
Living people
Canadian female fencers
Olympic fencers of Canada
Fencers at the 1972 Summer Olympics
Fencers at the 1976 Summer Olympics
Sportspeople from New York City
American emigrants to Canada
Pan American Games medalists in fencing
Pan American Games silver medalists for Canada
Pan American Games bronze medalists for Canada
Fencers at the 1967 Pan American Games
20th-century Canadian women